Eslamabad (also Romanized as Eslāmābād; also known as Shāhrokhābād) is a village in Sahra Rural District, Anabad District, Bardaskan County, Razavi Khorasan Province, Iran. At the 2006 census, its population was 1,099, in 284 families.

References 

Populated places in Bardaskan County